Pregnanediol glucuronide, or 5β-pregnane-3α,20α-diol 3α-glucuronide, is the major metabolite of progesterone and the C3α glucuronide conjugate of pregnanediol (5β-pregnane-3α,20α-diol). Approximately 15 to 30% of a parenteral dose of progesterone is metabolized into pregnanediol glucuronide. While this specific isomer is referred to as pregnanediol glucuronide and is the most major form, there are actually many possible isomers of the metabolite.

References

Diols
Glucuronide esters
Human metabolites
Pregnanes